Tour Sequoia (previously known as tour Bull, and also known as tour SFR or tour Cegetel) is an office skyscraper located in La Défense business district just west of Paris, France.

Built in 1990, the 119-metre-tall tower represents the transition between the third and the fourth generations of buildings in La Défense. It is the first tower to be built with a semi-circular design in the business district. The design later inspired other towers such as CBC, Kupka, Pacific, Société Générale twin towers, and Tour CBX. Tour Sequoia has been built in proximity with the CNIT and the Grande Arche.

See also 
 Skyscraper
 La Défense
 List of tallest structures in Paris

External links 
 Tour Séquoia (Emporis)

Sequoia
Sequoia
Buildings and structures completed in 1990
Office buildings completed in 1990